"Yes, My Darling Daughter" is a 1940 song by Jack Lawrence first introduced by Dinah Shore on Eddie Cantor's radio program on October 24, 1940. It was Shore's first solo record, released by  Bluebird, and peaked at No. 10 on the Billboard magazine chart.

Тhe music 
The music used by Lawrence was borrowed from a Ukrainian folk-song "Oi ne khody, Hrytsju",. The same melody had also been borrowed by Catterino Cavos for his vaudeville The Cossack-Poet, although in the Cavos version it had an entirely different text: "Yes, of course, he is my lover..." ("Так, конечно, он мой милый...").

Musical structure 
Israeli musicologist Yakov Soroker posited the end of the first melodic phrase of "Oi ne khody Hrytsiu" contains a "signature" melody common in Ukrainian songs in general which he calls the "Hryts sequence" and gives a list of hundreds of Ukrainian folk songs from the Carpathians to the Kuban that contain this particular sequence. His estimation, after studying Z. Lysko's collection of 9,077 Ukrainian melodies was that 6% of Ukrainian folk songs contain the sequence.

Other scholars have also addressed the unique character and expressiveness of the Hryts sequence, such as Alexander Serov, who stated that "the refrain exudes a spirit of freedom that transports the listener to the steppes and is mixed with the sorrow of some unexpected tragedy."

Soroker notes the Hryts signature was used by composers Joseph Haydn (String Quartet no. 20, op. 9, no. 2; String quartet no. 25, op. 17, no 1; The Saviour's Seven last Words on the Cross, the Rondo of the D major Piano Concerto [composed 1795], Andante and variations for piano [1793]), Luigi Boccherini (duet no. 2), Wolfgang A. Mozart (Symphonia concertante K. 364), L. van Beethoven, J. N. Hummel, Carl Maria von Weber, Franz Liszt (Ballade d'Ukraine), Felix Petyrek,  Ivan Khandoshkin, and others.

Notable recordings
 Benny Goodman with Helen Forrest - recorded December 20, 1940 for Columbia.
 Eydie Gorme reached the No. 10 position in the UK charts in 1962.
 Glenn Miller & His Orchestra (vocal by Marion Hutton). This reached No. 9 on the Billboard charts.

References

1940 songs
Songs with lyrics by Jack Lawrence
Benny Goodman songs
Ukrainian folk songs
Bluebird Records singles
Dinah Shore songs